Kinesin-like protein KIF20A is a protein that in humans is encoded by the KIF20A gene.

Interactions 

KIF20A has been shown to interact with RAB6A.

References

Further reading

External links